Basil Mackenzie, 2nd Baron Amulree  (25 July 1900 – 15 December 1983) was a British physician and leading advocate of geriatric medicine in the United Kingdom.

Background and education
Amulree was born in South Kensington, London, England, the son of William Mackenzie, a barrister, and Lilian, daughter of W. H. Bradbury. He was educated at Lancing College and Gonville and Caius College, Cambridge.

Career
Upon graduating Amulree joined the Ministry of Health, initially working on the delivery of cancer services, but then on what would become geriatrics. Amulree at the ministry, J. H. Sheldon in Wolverhampton, Marjory Warren, Trevor Howell in Croydon and Oxford's Lionel Cosin were some of the founders of the Medical Society for the Care of the Elderly in 1947. In time, this would become the British Geriatrics Society and Amulree would lead this until 1973.

In 1929, Amulree's father was created Baron Amulree, and in 1942 he succeeded him in the barony, gaining a seat in the House of Lords.

In 1949 he become physician in charge of the geriatric department at University College Hospital, London. He was governor and president of a number of organisations including the British Geriatrics Society, the Society for the Study of Medical Ethics and the Association of Occupational Therapists.

In the Lords he sat as a Liberal and was a party Whip between 1955 and 1977. He spoke in the Lords on a variety of issues in relation to the care of the elderly.

Personal life
Amulree died on 15 December 1983, aged 83, unmarried. The barony became extinct on his death. According to James Lord, around 1948 he was having an affair with the art historian Douglas Cooper; when they parted, Cooper settled with John Richardson.

Arms

References

External links

Lord Amulree's Jacobite Collection at the University of Stirling Archive

1900 births
1983 deaths
People from South Kensington
People educated at Lancing College
2
Knights Commander of the Order of the British Empire
Alumni of Gonville and Caius College, Cambridge
English people of Scottish descent
20th-century English medical doctors
Fellows of the Royal College of Physicians
Liberal Party (UK) hereditary peers
LGBT peers
LGBT physicians
English LGBT politicians
20th-century British LGBT people